Viniana Naisaluwaki Riwai (born 6 June 1991) is a Fijian footballer, who plays as a midfielder for Rewa FC and the Fiji women's national team, and a rugby sevens player, who plays for the Fiji women's national team.

Riwai was educated at Labasa Sangam Primary School, Labasa Muslim College, and Suva Sangam College. She later studied at the University of the South Pacific.

Football career

Riwai took up soccer in high school and was selected for the Fiji women's football team for the 2011 Pacific Games. She capped for Fiji at senior level during the 2018 OFC Women's Nations Cup.

Rugby sevens career
Riwai made her senior international debut for the Fiji women's national rugby sevens team at the 2013 China Women's Sevens. She was named in the 2013 Rugby World Cup Sevens squad for Fiji. She was a member of the Fijian team at the 2016 Summer Olympics. 

Riwai competed for Fiji in rugby sevens at the 2020 Summer Olympics and she won a bronze medal at the event.

Riwai was part of the Fijiana sevens team that won the silver medal at the 2022 Commonwealth Games in Birmingham. She also featured at the Rugby World Cup Sevens in Cape Town.

References

External links

 

1991 births
Living people
Fijian women's footballers
Women's association football midfielders
Fiji women's international footballers
Fijian female rugby union players
Fiji international rugby sevens players
Olympic rugby sevens players of Fiji
Rugby sevens players at the 2016 Summer Olympics
Footballers who switched code
Rugby sevens players at the 2020 Summer Olympics
Medalists at the 2020 Summer Olympics
Olympic bronze medalists for Fiji
Olympic medalists in rugby sevens
Fiji international women's rugby sevens players
Commonwealth Games silver medallists for Fiji
Commonwealth Games medallists in rugby sevens
Rugby sevens players at the 2022 Commonwealth Games
Medallists at the 2022 Commonwealth Games